Malaysia competed in the 1979 Southeast Asian Games held in Jakarta, Indonesia from 21 to 30 September 1979.

Medal summary

Medals by sport

Medallists

Football

Men's tournament
Group stage 

Gold medal match

References

1979
Nations at the 1979 Southeast Asian Games